Norman Picklestripes is a stop-motion musical children's television series that premiered July 27, 2019 on Universal Kids. The series is produced by an animation studio in Manchester, UK, Factory, that was awarded by BAFTA and Kidscreen. The series follows forest animals going through comedic adventures of Plywood Forest's can-do handyman, Norm. The series also features Broadway–inspired songs.

Characters

Main
 Norman “Norm” Picklestripes (voiced by Dwayne Hill) is a green-striped bear-like creature who is Plywood Forest's handyman. He can solve all sorts of problems. He is the son of Mother Nature.
 Bob (voiced by David Berni) is a neurotic and lovable porcupine and is Norm's oldest friend.
 Blanche (voiced by Stacey DePass) is a sassy and fashionable rabbit. She likes everything to be clean in Plywood Forest.
 Marco (voiced by Alexander Marsh) is a 8-year old raccoon is very active and full of energy. He thinks that he is good at jumping, running, and hip hop dancing, but is still learning how to do them right. He also wears a fake mask, for reasons.
 Bixie (voiced by Bryn McAuley) is a skunk that advances at arts and crafts. She is also an owner and chief of her own salon, "Chop Chop Hair Salon".

Recurring
The Possums are three blue Possums who like hanging out with Norm in the Forest. The “lead possum” is named Blake and the other two possums are named Travis and Drew. Blake is voiced by Christian Martyn and Travis and Drew are respectively voiced by Dan Petronijevic and Robert Tinkler.
Mother Nature (voiced by Judy Marshank) is a pink-striped bear-like creature who is Norm's Mom.
Betsy (voiced by Shayelin Martin) is a young skunk who is Bixie's sister. 
Juniper (voiced by Tajja Isen) is a young frog who wears a bonnet. 
Fred (voiced by Deven Mack) is a friendly purple spider. 
The Gophers are two gophers who are Norm's assistants who like to chant "Magic" two or three times and say "One More Time" at the end of every episode to sing the episode's main song once again. Their names, however, are not revealed. Respectively voiced by Taylor Abrahamse and Bryn McAuley.
Carl (also voiced by David Berni) is a male weasel.
 Additional voices – Christian Potenza, Seán Cullen, Addison Holley, Mika Shimozato, Joe Cobden, Terry McGurrin, Ron Pardo, Lilly Bartlam, Cory Doran, Jacqueline Pillon, Jake Beale, Annick Obonsawin, Julie Lemieux, Jonathan Wilson, Christian Distefano, Scott McCord, Patrick McKenna, Novie Edwards, Kristin Fairlie, John Stocker, Joe Pingue, Hugh Duffy, Carolyn Hay, Andrew Sabiston, Jesse Camacho, Colin Doyle, Erin Pitt, Tyler James Nathan, Katie Griffin, Devan Cohen, Trek Buccino, Jenna Warren, Jacob Ewaniuk, Paul Braunstein, Aurora Browne, Dan Chameroy, Rebecca Husain, Drew Davis, Gage Munroe, Tyler Murree, Amos Crowley, Jordi Mand, Camden Angelis, Phil McCordic, Darren Frost, Stephanie Anne Mills, Meesha Contreras, Adrian Truss, Catherine Disher, Julie Sype and Jonah Wineburg

Episodes

References 

Universal Kids original programming
2019 American television series debuts
2021 American television series endings
2010s American animated television series
2020s American animated television series
2010s American children's television series
2020s American children's television series
2019 British television series debuts
2021 British television series endings
2010s British animated television series
2020s British animated television series
2010s British children's television series
2020s British children's television series
2019 Canadian television series debuts
2021 Canadian television series endings
2010s Canadian animated television series
2020s Canadian animated television series
2010s Canadian children's television series
2020s Canadian children's television series
2010s preschool education television series
2020s preschool education television series
American children's animated fantasy television series
American children's animated musical television series
American preschool education television series
American stop-motion animated television series
Animated preschool education television series
British children's animated fantasy television series
British children's animated musical television series
British preschool education television series
British stop-motion animated television series
Canadian children's animated fantasy television series
Canadian children's animated musical television series
Canadian preschool education television series
Canadian stop-motion animated television series
English-language television shows
Animated television series about bears
Animated television series about rabbits and hares
Television series about raccoons